Dane A. Davis is a sound editor with over 150 film credits. He won the Academy Award for Best Sound Editing during the 72nd Academy Awards for The Matrix.

He is most known for his work on The Matrix films. With the exception of Cloud Atlas, he has worked on all the films by The Wachowskis and their TV series, Sense8.

He provided the voice of Morph in Treasure Planet (2002).

He is the president of Danetracks Studios.

References

External links

American sound editors
Best Sound Editing Academy Award winners
Best Sound BAFTA Award winners
Living people
Date of birth missing (living people)
Year of birth missing (living people)